Austroencyrtus is a genus of parasitic wasps.

Taxonomic history and synonyms
In 1923, Alexandre Arsène Girault described the species A. annulicornis and circumscribed the new genus Austroencyrtus for it. In 1941, Girault created a new genus, Zamenhofella for another new species, Z. voltai. The genus Zamenhofella was classified as a junior synonym of Austroencyrtus in 1997 by Edward Dahms and Gordon Gordh.

Species
, the following species are recognized:
 Austroencyrtus annulicornis 
 Austroencyrtus ceresii 
 Austroencyrtus voltai

Former and undescribed species
In 1984,  and  included A. guamensis , which they had transferred from Cerchysius. Noyes and Hayat also claimed there were at least three additional undescribed species in Austroencyrtus from Papua New Guinea and New Hebrides.

Distribution
Species in this genus are found in Australia and China.

References

Encyrtinae
Hymenoptera genera